The ISU Junior Grand Prix in Canada is an international figure skating competition. Sanctioned by the International Skating Union, it is held in the autumn in some years as part of the JGP series. Medals may be awarded in the disciplines of men's singles, ladies' singles, pair skating, and ice dancing.

Junior medalists

Men

Ladies

Pairs

Ice dancing

References

External links 
 ISU Junior Grand Prix at the International Skating Union
 Skate Canada

Canada
Junior Grand Prix